David Droga (born 1968) is an Australian advertising executive and the founder and chairman of Droga5, an advertising agency headquartered in New York City with offices in London and Tokyo. Droga5 was acquired by Accenture in 2019 and David was named CEO of Accenture Interactive in August, 2021.

Early life and education
Droga grew up in Perisher Valley, Australia, the fifth of six children. His mother is of Danish descent, while his father was a Jewish businessman.  and a attended primary school at the Tudor House Preparatory School from 1978 to 1980 and spent his high school years at The King's School. He graduated with top honors from the Australian Writers and Art Directors School.

Career
At the age of 22, Droga became a Partner and Executive Creative Director of OMON Sydney. In 1996, he moved to Singapore to become Executive Creative Director of Saatchi & Saatchi Singapore and Regional Creative Director of Saatchi Asia. In 1998, Media Marketing named Saatchi Asia Regional Network of the Year and Advertising Age named the Singapore office International Agency of the Year.

Droga was promoted to Executive Creative Director of Saatchi & Saatchi London in 1999. In 2002, Advertising Age awarded Droga the World's Top Creative Director. Saatchi & Saatchi London won Global Agency of the Year at the Cannes International Advertising Festival and both Advertising Age and Adweek named Saatchi Agency of the Year.

In 2003, Droga moved to New York City to take a job as Worldwide Chief Creative Officer of the Publicis Network.

Droga5
Droga founded his own agency, Droga5, in 2006. Droga5 has received various top industry awards from Advertising Age, Adweek, and the Cannes Lions International Festival of Creativity. In December 2019, Adweek named Droga5 its Agency of the Decade, followed by Advertising Age in April 2020.  Droga5 was also named Adweek's US Agency of the Year in 2012, 2014, and 2016. The agency was named Independent Agency of the Year at the Cannes Lions International Festival of Creativity in 2015, 2016, and 2017. It has appeared on the Advertising Age A-List for nine consecutive years (2010–2018) and was named the publication's Agency of the Year in 2016  and 2021. The agency has also been named one of Fast Company'''s World's Most Innovative Companies in 2013, 2017, 2019, and 2020.

Accenture Song
Accenture appointed Droga as Accenture Song's new CEO and creative chairman, effective September 1, 2021.

Affiliations and recognition
As of 2011 Droga was the most awarded creative at the Cannes Lions International Festival of Creativity and in 2013 he was the youngest person inducted into the New York Art Directors Club Hall of the Fame. He is also a laureate of the Asian Media and Marketing Hall of Fame, the AdNews Hall of Fame, the Campaign Brief AWARD Hall of Fame, and the American Advertising Federation's Advertising Hall of Achievement. 
In 2016 Adweek named Droga one of the top 100 most influential leaders in marketing, media and technology for the second time. Esquire magazine has featured Droga in its annual Best and Brightest issue three times, and Creative'' magazine named him Australian Creative Person of the Decade. In 2012 he was named Global Australian of the Year by the Australian Advance Committee and honoured by the American Australian Association and G'Day USA. In 2017, David Droga received the Cannes Lions Festival of Creativity's Lion of St. Mark, the festival's award for outstanding contribution to the creative industry. In 2018 Droga was named Jury President of the Cannes  Sustainable Development Goals Lions. In 2019 the Clio Awards honored Droga with a Lifetime Achievement Award.

References

External links
 Droga5 website

Australian businesspeople
Australian Jews
Living people
Businesspeople from Sydney
1972 births